Frank Cluskey (8 April 1930 – 7 May 1989) was an Irish Labour Party politician who served as Minister for Trade, Commerce and Tourism from 1982 to 1983, Leader of the Labour Party from 1977 to 1981 and Parliamentary Secretary to the Minister for Social Welfare from 1973 to 1977. He served as a Teachta Dála (TD) for the Dublin South-Central and Dublin Central constituencies from 1965 to 1981 and 1982 to 1989.

Early and personal life
Cluskey was born on 8 April 1930 in Dublin, the youngest of two sons and three daughters of Francis Cluskey a butcher and active trade unionist, and Elizabeth Cluskey (née Millington). His father was long-serving secretary of the butchers' section of the Workers' Union of Ireland (WUI)), and a close associate of James Larkin. He was educated at St. Vincent's C.B.S. in Glasnevin. He worked as a butcher and then joined the Labour Party. He quickly became a branch secretary in the WUI. He married Eileen Gillespie in 1965, a post office civil servant from Clontarf; she died after a short illness in 1978. They had two daughters and one son.

Politics
At the 1965 general election he was elected as a Labour Party Teachta Dála (TD) for the Dublin South-Central constituency. He was a member of Dublin City Council from 1960 to 1969, and in 1968 he was elected Lord Mayor of Dublin. In 1973 he was appointed Parliamentary Secretary to the Minister for Social Welfare, Brendan Corish. He introduced sweeping reforms to the area while he held that position, pushing  through legislation introducing a 'single-mothers' welfare allowance and managing with his colleagues to triple welfare spending between 1973 and 1977. He played a leading role in initiating the EU Poverty Programmes.

The Fine Gael–Labour Party coalition was defeated at the 1977 general election resulting in the resignation of Brendan Corish as Labour Party leader. Cluskey was elected the new leader of the Labour Party. In 1981, the Labour Party entered into a coalition government with Fine Gael. However Cluskey had lost his seat at the 1981 general election and resigned the party leadership. On 1 July 1981, he was appointed as a Member of the European Parliament (MEP) for Dublin, replacing Michael O'Leary, who had resigned the seat after succeeding Cluskey as Labour leader.

The coalition government fell in January 1982 over a budget dispute, and Cluskey was re-elected to the Dáil at the February 1982 general election. When the coalition returned to office after the November 1982 election, Cluskey was appointed as Minister for Trade, Commerce and Tourism. He then resigned from the European Parliament, to be replaced by Brendan Halligan.

On 8 December 1983 he resigned as Minister due to a fundamental disagreement over government policy about the Dublin Gas Company. He retained his Dáil seat in the 1987 general election.

Following his re-election his health deteriorated. He died on 7 May 1989 after a long battle with cancer.

References

External links

1930 births
1989 deaths
Deaths from cancer in the Republic of Ireland
Labour Party (Ireland) MEPs
Leaders of the Labour Party (Ireland)
Lord Mayors of Dublin
Members of the 18th Dáil
Members of the 19th Dáil
Members of the 20th Dáil
Members of the 21st Dáil
Members of the 23rd Dáil
Members of the 24th Dáil
Members of the 25th Dáil
MEPs for the Republic of Ireland 1979–1984
Parliamentary Secretaries of the 20th Dáil
Politicians from County Dublin
Labour Party (Ireland) TDs
Ministers for Enterprise, Trade and Employment